"Sweet Desire" is a 1978 single by The Kendalls.  "Sweet Desire" was The Kendalls' fourth country hit and their second number one on the country chart.  The single stayed at number one for one week and spent a total of 15 weeks on the charts. The song charted as a double-sided single with b-side "Old Fashioned Love" also listed on the charts.

Chart performance

References
 

1978 singles
The Kendalls songs
1978 songs